The 2011–12 Bowling Green Falcons men's basketball team represented Bowling Green State University during the 2011–12 NCAA Division I men's basketball season. The Falcons, led by fifth year head coach Louis Orr, played their home games at the Stroh Center and are members of the East Division of the Mid-American Conference. They finished the season 16–16, 9–7 in MAC play to finish in fifth place in the East Division. They lost in the first round of the MAC Basketball tournament to Central Michigan. They were invited to the 2012 CollegeInsider.com Tournament where they lost in the first round to Oakland.

Roster

Schedule

|-
!colspan=9| Exhibition

|-
!colspan=9| Regular season

|-
!colspan=9| 2012 MAC men's basketball tournament

|-
!colspan=9| 2012 CIT

References

Bowling Green Falcons men's basketball seasons
Bowling Green
Bowling Green